Arthur Patrick Thompson (1916–1988) was an Irish National Hunt racing jockey, during the 1930s, 1940s and 1950s notable for riding the winner of the Grand National twice. Firstly with Sheila's Cottage in 1948 and then with Teal in 1952
  
He was born in Carlow in 1916.

During World War 2 he joined the Northumberland Fusiliers, and became a 'Desert Rat', and spent 3 years as a POW in Germany.

After retiring from the saddle in 1956, he was a trainer until May 1988. He died later that year in Wexford.

References

1916 births
1988 deaths
Irish jockeys